Zazpiak Bat is a heraldic nickname for the Basque coat of arms which includes the arms of the seven provinces mentioned, stressing their unity. It was designed by the historian Jean de Jaurgain in 1897 for the Congrès et Fêtes de la Tradition basque celebrated at Saint-Jean-de-Luz.

Name
Zazpiak Bat is a motto attributed to Basque explorer Antoine-Thomson d'Abbadie in the late nineteenth century, from the Basque words zazpiak meaning 'the seven' and bat meaning 'one', translates as "the seven [are] one" and refers to the seven Basque Country traditional provinces. However, it was first cited in 1836 by a friend and collaborator of Antoine d'Abbadie's, the Souletin Agosti Xaho (Etudes grammaticales sur la langue euskarienne, dedicated to the Zazpirak Bat). The motto is based on a similar one fashioned by the Enlightenment society Real Sociedad Bascongada de Amigos del País in 1765, Irurac bat, 'the three [are] one', after the provinces currently making up the Basque Autonomous Community), while a like variant was created too in the 19th century known as Laurak bat ('the four [are] one', after the four Basque provinces in Spain), a motto quoted and celebrated by the Provincial Government of Navarre in 1866.

History

The original Zazpiak Bat features a design of traditional arms of six Basque territories, namely Álava, Gipuzkoa, and Biscay (the three which make the Basque Autonomous Community) plus Navarre (both in Spain); and the two that are part of the French department of the Pyrénées Atlantiques - Soule and Labourd. The coat of arms of the third traditional province, Lower Navarre is subsumed under the coat of arms of the Kingdom of Navarre, therefore omitted and represented by the latter. The modern design is based on the current simplified heraldry of these territories.

Laurak Bat

Laurak Bat with the four Basque provinces in Spain was adopted as the coat of arms of the Basque autonomous community. The coat of arms of Navarre was originally included in the seven quarter of the shield, but following a protest from the UPN led government of Navarre, the Constitutional Court of Spain forced the Basque government to remove the chains of Navarre from the Basque insignia. The red background of the Navarrese insignia currently occupies the fourth quarter of the coat of arms of the Basque Country.

References

External links
  Website with various Basque flags and arms

Basque culture
Mottos
Spanish coats of arms
Coats of arms of country subdivisions
Coats of arms with chains
Coats of arms with crowns
Coats of arms with swords
Coats of arms with sceptres
Coats of arms with trees
Coats of arms with crosses
Coats of arms with buildings
Coats of arms with lions
Coats of arms with fleurs de lis
Coats of arms with animals
Coats of arms with cannons
Symbols introduced in 1897